Emanuel Lorenz Philipp (March 25, 1861 – June 15, 1925) was an American railroad executive and politician from Wisconsin, who served as the 23rd governor of Wisconsin from 1915 to 1921.

Early life
Philipp was born in Honey Creek, Sauk County, Wisconsin, the son of Sabina ( Ludwig) and Luzi Philipp. He attended the common schools and worked as a railroad telegraph operator in Baraboo, Wisconsin before becoming the telegrapher and agent for the Chicago and Northwestern Railroad in Lodi, Wisconsin.

Career
Philipp also worked for the Gould transcontinental system and as traffic manager for Schlitz Brewery Company.

While he was a manager of a lumber company in Mississippi from 1894 to 1902, he founded the unincorporated community of Philipp in Tallahatchie County, Mississippi. He bought the Union Refrigerator Transit Company in St. Louis in 1903, and reorganized it as the Union Refrigerator Transit Company of Wisconsin after moving it to Milwaukee, Wisconsin.

Political career
He held various political positions in Wisconsin. He served with Robert M. La Follette, Sr. as chairman of the Milwaukee County Convention, before disagreeing with him over railroad oversight. From 1909-1914 he was the Milwaukee Police Commissioner. A conservative Republican, he wrote, with the help of Edgar Werlock, Political Reform in Wisconsin: A Historical Review of the Subjects of Primary Election, Taxation and Railway Regulation (1910).

In 1914, Philipp was nominated for Governor of Wisconsin, and won the election. He won reelection twice, and served as the 23rd Governor of Wisconsin from 1915-1921. After leaving office, he returned to his business pursuits. He operated two model farms and served as regent of Marquette University.

Death
Philipp died on June 15, 1925, aged 64, in Milwaukee and is interred at Forest Home Cemetery in Milwaukee.

Family life
Philipp married Bertha Schweke in 1887, and they had three children. Their son Cyrus L. Philipp served as the Chairman of the Republican Party of Wisconsin.

References

External links

 
National Governors Association
Image Gallery
The Philipp Family: Governor Emanuel L, Philipp

1861 births
1925 deaths
People from Tallahatchie County, Mississippi
People from Honey Creek, Sauk County, Wisconsin
Businesspeople from Mississippi
Businesspeople from Wisconsin
Republican Party governors of Wisconsin
Writers from Wisconsin
American city founders
Politicians from Milwaukee
19th-century American railroad executives
Burials in Wisconsin